Captain Triumph is a superhero from the Golden Age of Comics who first appeared in Crack Comics #27, published in January 1943 by Quality Comics. He continued to appear until the end of the series with issue #62 (Sept 1949).

The character was later obtained by DC Comics, though by that time he had already lapsed into the public domain. Some of his Golden Age adventures were reprinted by AC Comics in the Men of Mystery anthology. He is not to be confused with another DC Comics property named Triumph.

Origin

In 1919 twin brothers Michael and Lance Gallant are born in New York City. They are so alike, even down to a T-shaped birthmark on their left wrists, that their own mother cannot tell them apart. The two remain close, even for twins, as they grow up.

When America is drawn into the Second World War, Michael enlists in the U.S. Army Air Corps, becoming a pilot, while Lance "crusaded with his own weapons – the word and pen" by becoming a journalist. However, on Michael's 23rd birthday, as he brings his plane in to land, the hangar he is entering explodes. His fiancée, Kim Meredith, and brother Lance witness this act of sabotage, and the latter races into the burning structure, managing to find his badly injured sibling, only for Michael to die in his arms.

Lance swears vengeance on the murderers and those like them. Unknown to him, the Fates, creatures of myth, are watching all this and, impressed, decide to create a champion. Soon afterwards Lance receives a shocking visitation from Michael's ghost, who reveals that they remain linked together, and if Lance touches his birthmark they will merge, gaining superpowers as a result. Touching the mark a second time will separate them again. Calling himself Captain Triumph, Lance becomes a crimefighter.

Creative teams
The identity of the writer is unremembered, but as the series opens, the artist is Alfred Andriola, former assistant to Milton Caniff on Terry and the Pirates (Andriola had also drawn a newspaper comic based on author Earl Derr Biggers's famous character Charlie Chan). He stays with Captain Triumph a mere six months, leaving to create the character he's best remembered for, Kerry Drake. The artists in the middle issues of Captain Triumph's Crack Comics run are mostly a matter of conjecture, as Golden Age artists frequently did not sign their work. Beginning in Crack Comics #46 and ending only with the book's cancellation, Captain Triumph's adventures are penciled and inked for an unbroken 17-issue run by Golden Age great Reed Crandall.

Costume

Captain Triumph has a minimal costume consisting of a plain, red, short-sleeved, crew neck  T-shirt, ordinary white jodhpurs, a brown belt, brown riding boots, and no mask. Comic book historian Don Markstein has commented: "By the time Cap appeared in 1943, the tide of superhero comic book characters was receding somewhat. Captain Triumph's costume was just enough to get across the idea he was a superhero, but since the genre was fading did not emphasize the fact".

Captain Triumph belongs to that select class of superheroes who, like Superman/Clark Kent, is never recognized in his superhero identity, even when being seen, by the same person, as Captain Triumph immediately after being seen as Lance Gallant and vice versa – despite the fact that he wears no mask and does not even have Clark Kent's glasses to disguise his face.

Supporting cast
Kim Meredith is introduced in Captain Triumph's first appearance as Michael Gallant's fiancée. In his second appearance, both Michael's ghost and Lance jointly tell her the secret of Captain Triumph. An extremely strong-willed young woman, thereafter she is Cap's devoted and trustworthy helper and confidante. In one adventure, after being kidnapped, she refuses to give her captor any information on Captain Triumph even though she is beaten "…until [her] face is covered with blood and welts and open wounds". Eventually she becomes Lance's fiancée, as well.

In his fourth appearance, Captain Triumph encounters a down-on-his-luck professional clown named Biff who is on the verge of being fired from his job. Sympathizing, Cap uses his powers of flight and invisibility to ensure that Biff's next show is spectacular. Even though in the aftermath his job as a clown is at least temporarily assured, after being drawn into one of Cap's adventures, and thoroughly enjoying it, Biff readily accepts Lance Gallant's offer to become his personal assistant. Though Lance Gallant is presented as being born into "a middle-class family" and at the time supposedly has as income only his journalist's pay, he has no problem affording a personal, live-in assistant. Thereafter the burly former clown serves as Lance, Michael and Captain Triumph's steadfast friend and backup muscle.

According to Jess Nevins' Encyclopedia of Golden Age Superheroes, "his enemies include Sydney Greenstreet-like Spade the Ruthless, the mad scientist Dr. Vossburg ("the Man Who Conquered Flame"), the Nazi spy the Raven (and his stolen sonic death grenades), and the unspeaking criminal mastermind known only as Silent".

Eventually Lance, Kim and Biff wind up co-owners in a successful gold mine, and Biff buys shares in a "record-breaking" oil well, but though this makes them all independently wealthy they continue to stay, and adventure, together.

Personality
Before Michael's death, and his merging with Lance to become Captain Triumph, the two are extraordinarily close, and alike, even for twins: "As they grew, the bonds of love and companionship that existed between them became stronger than any bond of steel or cable of strength that man could manufacture. So close were they, that in their work, their play, and the exciting adventures that filled their lives, their bodies responded but to one mind".

Both twins are intelligent, daring, and athletic. Though they are presented as being very similar, throughout the series it becomes obvious that Lance is the more thoughtful, and intellectually inclined of the two, while Michael is more the daredevil, witness their differing vocations of journalist and military pilot, respectively.

When the twins merge into Captain Triumph, they form a composite personality, with neither obviously dominant, and when they split apart again they are both aware of everything that has occurred to them as Captain Triumph.

Powers

When Lance Gallant merges with the ghost of his brother Michael, the two form Captain Triumph.

Within the context of this series, the Fates are presented as three hag-like crones, sisters named Chance, Destiny and Fortune. They give Captain Triumph three "ghostly" powers: flight, invisibility and near invulnerability. As Michael Gallant says when his spirit first appears to his brother: "I can make you invisible! You shall fly through space within seconds! Nothing physical will harm you!"

When the brothers are separated into two individuals, Michael, as a ghost, can move through walls, spy invisibly and then report back to Lance. On the initial occasion, when Michael reveals his existence to Kim she is able to see and hear him. Thereafter, though Lance can always definitely see and hear Michael, whether Kim or Biff can do so is inconsistently presented throughout the series - and sometimes within the same story.

With intense concentration, Michael is able to communicate with, and influence the actions of, other people and creatures. When the Jacksons are threatened, Michael is able to influence April, the daughter of the family, that she should write to Lance Gallant for help. In "The Castle of Shadows!" he controls a rat to gnaw through ropes binding Kim and he compels a criminal to not search the hiding place of an important document.

Captain Triumph has the ability to alter his physical appearance, shape and size, and at the same time change his voice, a power that comes in very handy when his adventures require impersonation.

Captain Triumph also has limited super-strength. He can stop a racing car by either grabbing its bumper or standing in front of it and punching it, bend rifle barrels, break chains and snap rifle bayonets with his bare hands. He can also punch through a brick wall, steel bank vault doors and jail bars, and routinely holds his own in physical confrontations against multiple, normal human attackers much larger than he is. However, his opponents are never seriously injured, and sometimes not even disabled, by his full-power enthusiastic blows.

Captain Triumph is almost but not completely invulnerable. On numerous occasions he is shot repeatedly, and the bullets have no effect. Attempts to kill him with knives or swords see them bend or break on his body. Hitting him with an axe results in the axe handle breaking. He survives a pointblank bazooka blast with no damage. Being shot with an atomic beam that can cut through anything (and does in fact easily cut an oceangoing freighter completely in two) only causes him to laugh and say, "I’m ticklish!" When faced with a powerful "explosive pill" about to go off and wreck a defense factory, his solution to the problem is to simply swallow the pill. However, being exposed to the sonic vibrations of a "screaming bomb" that kills normal people does render him temporarily unconscious.

Publication history

Crack Comics
Crack Comics started out as a monthly title, like most 1940s anthology comic books, but dropped down to bi-monthly shortly after World War II began, due to wartime paper shortages. It switched to quarterly about a year after Captain Triumph joined the lineup. When the war was over, most surviving anthologies ramped back up to monthly, but Crack Comics only ever got back to bi-monthly (coming out in odd-numbered months). It did outlast most of the others, succumbing with its 62nd issue, dated September 1949.

Captain Triumph's only appearances during the Golden Age were within 36 issues of Crack Comics, from his introduction in #27 until the book's cancellation with #62. He was the lead feature within, and appeared on the cover of, every one of those issues.

The End of Quality Comics
By the mid-1950s, with television and paperback books drawing readers away from comic books in general and superheroes in particular, interest in Quality's characters had declined considerably. After a foray into other genres such as war, humor, romance and horror, the company ceased operations with comics cover dated December 1956. Many of its properties were sold to National Periodical Publications (now DC Comics) which chose to keep only a few titles running, such as Blackhawk and G.I. Combat. Though it owned the rights to Captain Triumph, DC would not use the character for several more decades.

The All-Star Squadron

Captain Triumph appears on the cover of the first issue of All-Star Squadron as one of a group of photos spread over a table, along with the tag line "Who Will Be the Heroes of the....All-Star Squadron" although he does not actually appear within the issue - or anywhere else in the series, for that matter. Writer Roy Thomas indicates he always intended to use Captain Triumph in All-Star Squadron but never got around to it before the title was cancelled.

Animal Man
Captain Triumph appears in flashback in a small cameo in one issue of Grant Morrison's Animal Man series, fighting the unsuccessful supervillain The Red Mask who describes him - from his not unbiased viewpoint - as possessing "the personality of a deck chair".

The Titans
Captain Triumph retires from action at an unknown time.  Lance later appears in The Titans as a friend of Jesse Quick's mother, the aged heroine Liberty Belle.  Michael is still present as a spirit but has apparently gone psychotic in the many years of inactivity. The twins discover a love affair between Jesse and her mother's young fiancé. Lance tries to confront the fiancé on the matter but is taken over by Michael's ghost, who as Captain Triumph quickly murders the man for his infidelity to his friend.

Jim Shelley on Flashback Universe refers to this tale of an insane, murdering Captain Triumph as "his last appearance…probably best forgotten".

Female version
A new, female Captain Triumph debuts in Uncle Sam and the Freedom Fighters. This version only demonstrates super-strength and the ability to fly.

Next Issue Project 
In November 2011, Captain Triumph appears, as part of Image Comics' Next Issue Project, in Crack Comics #63, written and penciled by Alan Weiss.

Harley Quinn 
In 2019's Harley Quinn #50-51, the Golden Age hero Captain Triumph gets stranded in the 21st century without Michael after Harley accidentally "destroyed continuity", according to Jonni DC, Continuity Cop.

Other versions

The Golden Age
Captain Triumph's most substantive post-Golden Age appearance is in The Golden Age, a four-issue prestige format miniseries in DC Comics' Elseworlds line, written by James Robinson with art by Paul Smith. In it, Lance Gallant has retired as Captain Triumph and is trying to lead a normal life, despite his brother's ghost urging him to become a hero again. When he meets the reformed supervillain the Tigress, he falls in love with her. In the end he refuses to listen to his brother's pleas and dies fighting the original Golden Age Robotman as a normal man, defending the Tigress.

James Robinson intended that The Golden Age be canon, and his subsequent series Starman assumed that many of the events in The Golden Age (for instance Ted Knight, the original Starman, having a nervous breakdown after his research was used to help create the atom bombs dropped on Hiroshima and Nagasaki) actually happened. The Golden Age has always been classed as a non-canonical "imaginary story" by DC's powers-that-be.

References

External links
Captain Triumph at The Unofficial Guide to the DC Universe
Captain Triumph at Don Markstein's Toonopedia. Archived from the original on April 9, 2012.

1943 comics debuts
Comics characters introduced in 1943
Quality Comics superheroes
DC Comics superheroes
Golden Age superheroes
DC Comics characters with superhuman strength
Triumph, Captain
Triumph, Captain
Triumph, Captain